The Culver Dart was a 1930s American two-seat light monoplane aircraft produced by the Dart Aircraft Company (later the Culver Aircraft Company).

Design and development
In the early 1930s Al Mooney was working for the Lambert Aircraft Corporation, builders of the Monocoupe series aircraft. He designed a small two-seat monoplane, the Monosport G. When the company ran into financial difficulties Mooney bought the rights to his design and with K.K. Culver formed the Dart Aircraft Company. The aircraft was renamed the Dart Dart or Dart Model G.

The aircraft was a low-wing monoplane designed to be light with clean lines to enable it to use low powered aero-engines. It had a fixed undercarriage and a tailwheel. The initial version was named the Dart G powered by a 90 hp (67 kW) Lambert R-266 radial engine. That engine was in short supply, so the aircraft was fitted with a  Ken-Royce engine and designated the Dart GK. The final version was the Dart GW powered by a Warner Scarab Junior radial engine. Two special aircraft were built with larger engines. In 1939 the company was renamed the Culver Aircraft Company and the aircraft was renamed the Culver Dart.

Variants

Dart G
Initial production version powered by a  Lambert R-266 - ca. 50 built.
Dart GC
 Continental O-200 - 10 built
Dart GK
Variant fitted with a   Ken-Royce 5G engine - 25 built.
Dart GW
Final production version powered by a  Warner Scarab Junior - 8 built.
Dart GW Special
 Two aircraft fitted with larger Warner engines, one with a  Warner Scarab engine, and the other with  Warner Super Scarab SS-50A engine.
X-F 220 Super Dart
An experimental variant modified with a  Continental R-670, 8 foot wing reduction and a  cruise speed. Used by Rodney Jocelyn in national aerobatics.

Surviving aircraft
The Ohio History Connection holds a Culver Dart G, NC18449, in its permanent collection since 2000. The airplane currently resides in offsite storage.

Specifications (Dart GW)

See also

References
Notes

Bibliography

 Baxter, Gordon. The Al Mooney Story. They All Fly Through The Same Air. Fredericksburg, Texas: Shearer Publishing, 1985. 
 The Illustrated Encyclopedia of Aircraft (Part Work 1982-1985). London: Orbis Publishing, 1985.
 Sargent, S.B., "Dashing and Darting Through the Sky: The diminutive Culver Dart Model LCA," Vintage Airplane, April 2007. retrieved 24 October 2018.
 Simpson, R.W. Airlife's General Aviation. Shrewsbury, UK: Airlife, 1991. .
 Simpson, Rod. Airlife's World Aircraft. Shrewsbury, UK: Airlife Publishing Ltd, 2001. .

External links

 Al Mooney designs
 Guide to the Al Mooney Papers, 1904-1986, Eugene McDermott Library, University of Texas, retrieved 24 October 2018.

1930s United States civil utility aircraft
Dart
Single-engined tractor aircraft
Low-wing aircraft